Mohamed Saleh Hadj Haidara (born 24 October 1974) is a Bahraini middle-distance runner. He competed in the men's 800 metres at the 2000 Summer Olympics.

References

1974 births
Living people
Athletes (track and field) at the 2000 Summer Olympics
Bahraini male middle-distance runners
Olympic athletes of Bahrain
Place of birth missing (living people)